Wachtküppel is a mountain of Hesse, Germany in the vicinity of the Wasserkuppe in the Rhön Mountains.

Mountains of Hesse
Mountains and hills of the Rhön